Hetman Białystok, formerly Gwardia Bialystok, is a Polish sports club based in Podlaskie Voivodeship.  The football section play in the Fifth Division.

History 
Gwardia was organized in 1948 as a Polish Citizens' Militia's (Communist Police) club. The name Gwardia used to be a common name for any Citizens' Militia's sports' club in Poland. Many players were soldiers serving in the Polish Army who were assigned to the units in or near Bialystok City.

Gwardia Bialystok was the first team from Bialystok after World War II  to advance to the 2nd League, but survived there only one season (1951–1952) before being relegated to the 3rd League.

With the fall of the Communist Oligarchy and the cessation of sponsorship, the club was forced to temporarily disappear in 1990.

The club was reactivated soon after when it changed its name from Gwardia to Hetman.  The club also added three other sections: amateur boxing, judo, and contract bridge.

Honours 
 2nd League: One season (1951–1952)
 3rd League: Group champion (2nd group out of 4 groups) (1953)
 Polish Cup – OZPN Białystok – 1952/53, 1953/54, 1954/55, 1955/56, 1960/61, 1978/79, 1981/82, 1985/86, 1986/87, 1993/94

Updates 
At the half—time winter break, Hetman leads in the Podlaska group of the new (old "5th") 4th or IV "Liga" Division. In the last game, Hetman defeated the previous leader, Piast also from Bialystok, 0:1 after a goal in the 39th minute scored by Lukasz Szarejko.

Current squad

Sections club 

The club also has a section of boxing, judo and duplicate bridge.

Notable boxers 

 Paweł Głażewski
 Grzegorz Kiełsa
 Andrzej Liczik
 Łukasz Maszczyk
 Kamil Szeremeta
 Krzysztof Zimnoch

References

External links 
Hetman Białystok web page 
Hetman Białystok (football club) at 90minut.pl 
Polish Soccer Podlasie Regional Association 

 
Sport in Białystok
Football clubs in Białystok
Association football clubs established in 1948
1948 establishments in Poland
Military association football clubs in Poland